Jo Jae-yoon (born September 15, 1974) is a South Korean actor. He made his acting debut in 2003 and has since starred as a supporting actor in numerous films and television series, including The Man from Nowhere (2010), The Chaser (2012), Gu Family Book (2013), and The Suspect (2013). Jo also appeared in the variety-reality show Animals (2015).

Filmography

Film

Television series

Web series

Television shows

Theater

Awards and nominations

References

External links
Jo Jae-yoon Fan Cafe at Daum 

Jo Jae-yoon on Instagram

1974 births
Living people
People from Cheongju
South Korean male film actors
South Korean male television actors
South Korean male stage actors
South Korean male musical theatre actors
South Korean television personalities
Seoul Institute of the Arts alumni
21st-century South Korean male actors